Somewhere in America may refer to:
 Somewhere in America (film), 1917 silent film
 Somewhere in America, 2001 album by Dynamite Boy
 "Somewhere in America", song by Survivor from their self-titled album, Survivor